The Mercedes-Benz EQA (H243) is a battery electric subcompact luxury crossover SUV produced by Mercedes-Benz. It is part of the EQ family, a range that will expand to include 10 new models by 2022.

Overview
The EQA is closely related to the ICE-powered second generation Mercedes-Benz GLA, which debuted in 2020. 

The only version initially available is the EQA 250 (EQA 260 in China). It has a  electric motor powering the front wheels.

A longer-range version was also announced. EQA 250+ was unveiled in March 2022 with a longer range (540 km WLTP), bigger battery (70.5 kwh), improved aerodynamics and a 140 kW permanent-magnet synchronous motor (PMSM) more efficient than the asynchronous motor of other versions. In May 2022, EQA 250 range have been increased to 490 km WLTP, probably by using the same motor as the new EQA 250+.

Models 
The specifications include:

References

External link 

 

EQA
Luxury crossover sport utility vehicles
Production electric cars
Mini sport utility vehicles
Cars introduced in 2021
Mercedes-EQ